Pontypool is a rural locality in the local government area (LGA) of Glamorgan–Spring Bay in the South-east LGA region of Tasmania. The 2016 census recorded a population of 53 for the state suburb of Pontypool.

History 
Pontypool is a confirmed locality. Pontypool, meaning “bridge by a pool”, is a town in Wales, and the likely source of the locality name.

Geography
The southern and eastern boundaries follow the shoreline of the Little Swanport River estuary.

Road infrastructure 
Route A3 (Tasman Highway) runs along the western boundary. From there, Pontypool Road provides access to the locality.

References

Towns in Tasmania
Localities of Glamorgan–Spring Bay Council